This is a timeline of the history of Korea. Some dates prior to the 5th century are speculative or approximate.

Early history
2333 BC: Legendary establishment of Gojoseon by Dangun.
1500 BC: Beginning of the Mumun pottery period.
800 BC: Beginning of the Liaoning bronze dagger culture.
400 BC: Beginning of the Iron Age.
300 BC: Establishment of Jin in southern Korean peninsula.

Proto(Before)-Three Kingdoms
195 BC: Establishment of Wiman Joseon.
108 BC: Han dynasty destroys Wiman Joseon, establishing four commanderies in northern Korean Peninsula.
57 BC:  Traditional date for the founding of Silla by Bak Hyeokgeose.
37 BC:  Traditional date for the founding of Goguryeo by Jumong.
18 BC:  Traditional date for the founding of Baekje by Onjo.

Three Kingdoms
42:  Traditional date for the founding of Gaya by Suro.
53:  Goguryeo becomes a centralized kingdom under Taejo's reign.
234:  Baekje becomes a centralized kingdom under Goi's reign.
313:  Goguryeo destroys Lelang Commandery.
356:  Silla becomes a centralized kingdom under Naemul's reign.
371:  Baekje's King Geunchogo invades Goguryeo and kills King Gogugwon.
372:  Under Sosurim, Goguryeo imports Buddhism from Former Qin of China.
384:  Chimnyu of Baekje officially adopts Buddhism.
392:  Gwanggaeto the Great of Goguryeo begins his reign, expanding Goguryeo into a major regional power.
413:  Jangsu of Goguryeo erects the Gwanggaeto Stele.
433:  Baekje and Silla form an alliance against Goguryeo's aggression.
475:  Goguryeo attacks Baekje and captures Hanseong (modern day Seoul). Baekje moves its capital south to Ungjin (modern-day Gongju), and again to Sabi (modern-day Buyeo) in 538.
494:  Last remains of Buyeo absorbed by Goguryeo.
498:  Baekje attacks Tamna (modern-day Jejudo).
512:  Silla conquers Usan (modern-day Ulleungdo).
527:  Silla formally adopts Buddhism
553:  Silla attacks Baekje, breaking the alliance.
562:  Silla completes annexation of Gaya.
598:  First of a series of major Sui dynasty attacks in the Goguryeo–Sui War, which ends in 614 in a costly defeat for Sui.
612:  Goguryeo repulses second Sui invasion at the Salsu.
645:  First campaign in the Goguryeo–Tang War.
648:  Silla establishes alliance with Tang.
660:  Baekje falls to the Silla-Tang forces.
668:  Goguryeo falls to the Silla-Tang forces.

North–South States Period and Later Three Kingdoms
676:  Silla repels Chinese alliance forces from Korean peninsula, completes unification of much of the Three Kingdoms.
698:  The founding of Balhae by former Goguryeo general Dae Joyeong.
751:  Silla, at its cultural peak, constructs Seokguram and Bulguksa.
828:  Jang Bogo establishes Cheonghaejin, a major center of trade with China, Japan, and Vietnam.
892:  Silla begins to lose control of parts of the peninsula as the brief Later Three Kingdoms period begins.
900:  Hubaekje ("Later Baekje") established in the southwest of the peninsula.
901:  Taebong ("Later Goguryeo") established in the northwest of the peninsula.
918:  Founding of Goryeo by Taejo of Goryeo.
926:  Balhae falls to Khitan forces.
935:  Silla formally surrenders to Goryeo.
936:  Hubaekje formally surrenders to Goryeo.

Goryeo
936:  Goryeo completes the reunification of the Later Three Kingdoms, absorbing the entirety of Hubaekje and parts of former Balhae territory.
956:  Emperor Gwangjong forces major land and slavery reforms, and in 958 implements civil service examinations.
993:  The first of three Goryeo–Khitan Wars.
1010:  The Second Goryeo–Khitan War ravages the northern border.
1018: The Third Goryeo–Khitan War, Khitan successfully repelled.
1033:  Goryeo builds the Cheonri Jangseong (lit. "Thousand Li Wall"), a massive wall running along the northern border.
1145:  Kim Bu-sik compiles the Samguk Sagi, Korea's oldest extant history text.
1170:  The military coup.
1231:  The Mongol invasions of Korea begin
1234:  Choi Yun-ui's Sangjeong Gogeum Yemun is published, world's first metal-block printed text.
1251:  Goryeo completes the Tripitaka Koreana, the most comprehensive and oldest intact version of the Buddhist canon in Chinese script
1268: Mongol peace treaty is signed which Mongols agree to protect them the best they can.
1270:  Goryeo signs a peace treaty with the Mongols, beginning an 80-year period of Yuan overlordship. The Sambyeolcho Rebellion lasts for three more years.
1285:  Il-yeon compiles the Samguk Yusa, record of history and legends
1388:  General Yi Seonggye, ordered to engage China in a border dispute, turns his troops against the Goryeo court.

Joseon
1392:  Yi Seonggye is crowned king, officially beginning the Joseon dynasty.
1394: Capital moved to Hanyang (modern-day Seoul)
1402: Paper currency initiated
1408: High military service examination system created
1420: Hall of Worthies established
1424: History of Goryeo compiled
1446: The Hangul alphabet, created 3 years earlier, is promulgated by King Sejong the Great.
1592: The Japanese invasion of Korea begins under the command of Toyotomi Hideyoshi. Admiral Yi Sun-sin employs the Turtle ship to repel Japanese naval forces.
1627: The Later jin invasion of Korea
1653: Dutch ship, with Captain Hendrick Hamel, wrecked on Jeju Island.
1791: Persecution of Catholicism begins.
1864: Gojong ascends the throne with his father, Daewongun, as Regent.
1866: French Campaign against Korea.
1871: United States expedition to Korea.
1876: Korean ports are formally opened under the Treaty of Ganghwa with Imperial Japan.
1882: Imo Incident: Mutiny by Korean soldiers in Seoul against the modernization policies of emperor Gojong
1884: Kim Okgyun leads the Gapsin Coup. In 3 days, Chinese forces are able to overwhelm the Progressives and their Japanese supporters.
1894: Donghak Rebellion prompts the First Sino-Japanese War and Gabo Reforms.
1895: China recognizes Korean independence in the Treaty of Shimonoseki. Empress Myeongseong was murdered by Japanese assassins.
1896: 11 February. King Gojong flees to the Russian legation in Korea (Seoul).

Korean Empire

1897: 20 February. King Gojong returns to his palace after 1 year of refuge at the Russian legation.
1905: Japan–Korea Treaty of 1905. Korea became the protectorate of Imperial Japan.
1907: June. The Hague Secret Emissary Affair
1907: 18 July. Gojong forced to abdicate in favour of his son, Sunjong by Imperial Japan.
1909: 26 October. Itō Hirobumi (Japanese Resident-General of Korea) is assassinated by Korean independence activist An Jung-geun
1910: 29 August. The Japan–Korea Treaty of 1910 started the annexation of the Korean Empire by Imperial Japan.

Japanese colonial rule
1916: The final wave of Uibyeong rebels is defeated by Japanese forces.
1919: March 1st Movement. Spurred by the sudden and mysterious death of Gojong. Declaration of Korean Independence. Nationwide peaceful demonstrations are crushed by Japanese military and police forces after two months. Governor-General Hasegawa resigns.
1919:  The establishment of The Provisional Government of the Republic of Korea in Shanghai.
1919: Saito Makoto appointed as third Governor-General of Korea. The period of "cultural policy" begins.
1920: Battle of Cheongsanri, Korean independence Army, led by Kim Jwa-jin, victory.
1926: June 10th Movement.
1932:  Korean independence activist Lee Bong-chang fails in his attempt to assassinate Emperor Hirohito in Tokyo.
1932:  Korean independence activist Yun Bong-gil bombs Japanese Military gathering in Shanghai.
1938: Governor-General of Korea begins Sōshi-kaimei (Order to Japanese-style name changes) policy.
1945: The Empire of Japan surrenders to the Allies. According to the terms of Potsdam Declaration, Korea becomes independent.

Division of Korea
1945:  After the surrender of Japan, the Korean peninsula is divided between Soviet and American occupation forces at the 38th parallel.
1945:  South Korea created a franchise to raise money and funds to recover.
1945: 6 September, Establishment of People's Republic of Korea with Lyuh Woon-hyung, but 1946 February, US Army breaks it and Lyuh Woon-hyung is murdered.
1946:  US–USSR Joint Commission on the formation of a Korean Government reaches an impasse. The Joint Commission is dissolved as the Cold War begins.
1948: 10 May. UN sponsored elections are held in South Korea.
1948: 15 August. Establishment of the Republic of Korea with Syngman Rhee as President.
1948: 9 September. Establishment of the Democratic People's Republic of Korea with Kim Il-sung as Premier.
1949:  The murder of Kim Gu.  Kim Gu was a Korean independence activist who believed in, and fought for, a unified Korea. He strongly objected to the formation of a separate South Korean state. He was shot in his home by a South Korean Army lieutenant.
1950: 25 June. The Korean War begins.
1950: August. UN forces are driven back to the south-east corner of the Korean Peninsula (The Pusan Perimeter).
1950: September. UN Troops make an Amphibious Landing at Inchon.
1950: November. Chinese Forces enter the war
1953: The Korean War is halted by the Korean Armistice Agreement that has remained in force until now.
1960: A student uprising begins the April Revolution which overthrows the autocratic First Republic of South Korea. Syngman Rhee resigns and goes into exile.
1961: 16 May. Military forces, headed by General Park Chung-hee, overthrow the Second Republic of South Korea in what is known as the Military Coup d'état of 16 May
1961: 12 November. Summit conference for normalization of Korean-Japanese relations
1962: start of the first Five-Year Plans of South Korea
1964: South Korea joined Vietnam War
1965: 22 June. The signing of Treaty on Basic Relations between Japan and the Republic of Korea. Earned both much controversy and procurement of budgets for later economic developments.
1967: start of the second Five-year plans of South Korea
1968: 21 January. An unsuccessful attempt of North Korean commandos to assassinate president Park Chung-hee- the Blue House raid.
1968: 1 April. Establishment of the Pohang Iron and Steel Company
1968: 5 December. Proclamation of the National Education Charter
1970: 22 April. Start of the government-operated New Community Movement
1970: Gyeongbu Expressway is completed and opened to traffic.
1972: start of the third Five-year plans of South Korea
1972: 12 August. The first Red Cross talks between North and South Korea are held.
1972: President Park Chung-hee declares Emergency martial law and changes Constitution in August, which may allow him to become the permanent ruler. This is similar to Gojong of the Korean Empire stating his country's governmental system as 'autocratic' in the constitution- for greater leadership and less opposition.
1974: 15 August. The assassination of first lady Yuk Young-soo by self-proclaimed North Korean Mun Segwang.
1976: 18 August. The Axe Murder Incident in Panmunjom, Joint Security Area. Triggers former North Korean leader Kim Il-sung's first official apology to the South.
1976: 12 October: Discontinuation of rice imports, the accomplishment of total self-sufficiency in rice by the 'Unification Rice'
1977: start of the fourth Five-Year Plans of South Korea
1977: 22 December. Celebration of achievement of 10 billion dollars gained by exports.
1978: 26 October. Detection of the 3rd tunnel. Made by North Korea to attack South Korea.
1978: 10 December. Achievement of 1,117 US dollars as GNP.
1979: American president Jimmy Carter visits Korea. Threatens Park by stating he would reduce the US forces in Korea if he does not stop the ongoing Nuclear Weapons Development project.
1979: 26 October, President Park Chung-hee is assassinated by the chief of KCIA, Kim Jae-gyu (Assassination of Park Chung-hee).
1979:  Coup d'état of December Twelfth, Chun Doo-hwan gets military power
1980:  Gwangju Uprising. Martial law is declared throughout the nation. The city of Gwangju becomes a battleground between dissenters and the Armed Forces (18–27 May). The official death toll was set at 200 people but some reports claim over 1000 casualties.
1987:  A student uprising begins the June Democracy Movement, which overthrows the autocratic Fifth Republic of South Korea. The ruling party of Fifth Republic, Democratic Justice Party, declares democratic elections.
1988: 24th Olympic Games held in Seoul
1990: 11 September: South Korea and the USSR established diplomatic relations.
1991: 17 September: North Korea (DPRK) and South Korea (ROK) join the United Nations (UN).
1991: 26 December: The end of the Cold War as the Soviet Union ceased to exist and North Korea loses military and economic aid.
1992: 11 August: South Korea's first satellite, KITSAT-1, a.k.a. 우리별 (Uri Byol) is successfully launched from Guiana Space Centre.
1992: 24 August: South Korea and the People's Republic of China (PRC) establish diplomatic relations.
1993:  Test of Rodong-1, a single-stage, mobile liquid propellant medium-range ballistic missile by the DPRK.
1994:  Kim Jong-il takes control of North Korea upon the death of his father Kim Il-sung. Start of the Arduous March.
1997: Asian Financial Crisis (or "IMF Crisis" as it was called in Korea) shakes Korea
1998:  Taepodong-1, a two-stage intermediate-range ballistic missile is developed and tested by the DPRK. End of the Arduous March. It is possible that up to 3.5 million people did not survive the 'march'.
1999:  The DPRK promises to freeze long-range missile tests.
2002:  The 2002 FIFA World Cup jointly held by Korea & Japan. South Korea national football team reaches the semi-finals for the first time in Korean football history. The DPRK pledges to extend moratorium on missile tests beyond 2003.
2004:  The DPRK reaffirms moratorium.
2005:  The DPRK fires short-range missile into the Sea of Japan (East Sea).
2006:  Test of Taepodong-2 by DPRK, a successor of Taepodong-1.There is a nuclear test in the DPRK. US officials assert it might have been a misfire.
2007:  The second summit between DPRK and ROK leaders is held, with Roh Moo-hyun representing the south and Kim Jong-il the north. The DPRK fires short-range missile into the Sea of Japan.
2009:  North Korea launches a rocket (Unha), supposedly for space exploration. This move affects relationships with Japan, the United States and South Korea. The DPRK conducts another nuclear test.
2010: North Korea launches missile and attacks Korean , ROKS Cheonan. 46 Korean soldiers die because of the attack. At November, North Korean army rains artillery fire on Yeon-Pyeong-Do island.
2011: Kim Jong-il dies, Kim Jong-un takes over as the Supreme Leader of North Korea. The National Intelligence Service accuses pro-unification lawmakers of being spies. One of the members was a former Democratic Party representative. In a move indicative of the heavy-handedness of the Park regime, the party is outlawed and key party members are imprisoned. 
2012: 13 April: The Kim Regime of the DPRK tested a rocket, officially called "Unha-3", an expendable launch system developed from the Soviet Scud rockets. The rocket was to send a satellite, called "Kwangmyŏngsŏng-3", into orbit. The rocket failed to launch the satellite and fell into the Yellow Sea. The mission ultimately ended in complete failure.
2012: 12 December: DPRK has successful launch of Kwangmyŏngsŏng-3 Unit 2 it was launched from the Sohae Satellite Launching Ground. A South Korean military official cited 3 stage success. DPRK confirmed.
2012: 19 December: Park Geun-hye, a daughter of Park Chung-hee, is elected as first female and the 11th president of South Korea.
2013: 8 December: Jang Song-thaek, uncle of North Korean Leader Kim Jong-un, was ousted from all powerful posts on various charges. The official Korean Central News Agency said the political bureau of the Central Committee of the Workers' Party of Korea stripped Jang of all posts, depriving him of all titles and expelling him and removing his name from the party.
2013: 12 December: North Korean Supreme Leader Kim Jong-un, executes his Uncle, Jang Song-thaek, as a "traitor for all ages."  Jang Song-thaek's execution was said to be set up by his own wife, Kim Kyong-hui, Late Supreme Leader Kim Jong-il's sister. Jang Song-thaek was considered to be the most powerful official in the DPRK Regime.
2016: 9 December: The impeachment vote of President Park Geun-hye took place, whilst 234 members in the 300-member National Assembly voting in favor of the impeachment and temporary suspension of her presidential powers and duties. Hwang Kyo-ahn, then prime minister, became acting president while the Constitutional Court of Korea was due to determine whether to accept the impeachment. 
2017: 10 March: The court upheld the impeachment in a unanimous 8–0 decision, removing Park from the office.
2017: 10 May: Moon Jae-In swore into office immediately after official votes were counted on 10 May, replacing Acting President and Prime Minister Hwang Kyo-Ahn.

Gallery

See also
 Korean monarchs' family trees: Silla; Goryeo; Joseon
List of Korean monarchs
History of Korea
Military history of Korea
Timeline of Seoul history

References

Further reading
 
  + "Democratic People's Republic of Korea"

External links
Timeline of Korean history

Comparative China-Korea-Japan arts timeline
 
 
 
 

Korea-related lists

Korea
 
Years in Korea